is a Japanese manga artist.

The manga artist was once active under her previous pen name,  at the end of the 1990s, but has abandoned the name after she won the Best Rookie award in the LMS for Kaeri Michi, Yuki no Netsu.

Her first series,   was serialized in Hakusensha's monthly shōjo manga magazine, LaLa. This series is licensed for North America, and an anime adaptation was broadcast during Spring 2010.

About

Personal
Hiro Fujiwara was born on December 23, 1981 in Hyōgo Prefecture. She also has two older brothers and two cats, but is currently living alone. She said that one of her older brothers was an otaku and anonymously posted the story of his younger sister, Hiro, on the web radio of her work Kaichō wa Maid-sama! in connection with its story of the Younger Sister Day.

She normally speaks standard Japanese but when she relaxes or let her guard down, she will speak in a Kansai accent in which she can hardly have control of. She also states that currently, she listens to songs by Akeboshi and Rie fu although her all-time favourite singer is Hikaru Utada. She uses background music while doing work.

She also says that being a manga artist was a dream profession when she was young. During high school, she concentrated in playing double bass. While doing literature in a university, she had a gap-year of 4 years to choose what she wanted to be. She started to become a manga artist after she graduated. She mentions that during her university days, she became an assistant for a manga artist and that the experience had helped her with her work now.

She seems to be friends with Yuki Fujitsuka, who authored Toremoto Beat. Fujitsuka's name came up in Kaichō wa Maid-sama!s 5th volume during the closing credits and Fujiwara also listed her as 'Yuki-sama' in her official website. The author and Yuki Fujitsuka both won the same category in the 31st Hakusensha Athena Newcomers' Awards in year 2006.

She also mentioned that all the characters in Kaichō wa Maid-sama! are easy to draw with the exception of Usui.

According to her old website, she does original CG and manga of all genres. She has also written poems.

Career
Hiro Fujiwara made her debut by winning the Best Rookie award in the 144th LaLa Mangaka Scout Course for her work . However, this was won under her name, Hiro Izumi and it went on to be published in the April 2005 issue of LaLa DX.

She has submitted a few works to Hakusensha's other contest besides the manga artist's other attempts at the LMS and LMG. Those works are, Fly and another untitled work that was going to be sent in to year 2002's LaLa Mangaka Scout Course. Diary. was sent into the 40th Big Challenge Awards but was not short-listed. She was placed 19th for Kakera, Hitotsu that was sent-in to the Hana to Yume Mangaka Course. The third work, Fly was submitted to the 27th Hakusensha Athena Newcomers' Awards and was mentioned in the 2nd issue of Hana to Yume as well as the February issue of LaLa.

Nevertheless, her second work was published six months after she won the Best Rookie award in the LaLa Mangaka Scout Course. However, it was her first work to be published under the current pen name, Hiro Fujiwara.  won the 36th LaLa Manga Grand Prix's Fresh Debut Award and was published in the November issue of LaLa DX in year 2004. In the same month, she also had another work titled  serialized in LaLa Special.

In 2005, she started the year by serializing  in the March issue of LaLa DX. Three months later, she went on to publish another one-shot,  and made her debut in LaLa DXs sister magazine, LaLa. In the November issue of LaLa DX, she published her last work of the year,  which was also later compiled together into Kaichō wa Maid-sama!s volume one.

In 2006, she made her last one-shot titled  which was published in the February issue of LaLa. She inspired in some things of Gakuen Alice of Tachibana Higuchi for do her manga, where discovered the Hakusensha editorial. However, this one-shot's popularity had made the one-shot span into a manga series which has been serialized in LaLa. It has 18 volumes published in Japan.

Besides authoring the manga, Fujiwara has also illustrated the furoku or freebies given out by the magazine as well as writing the scripts for the drama CDs.

The author had once gone to Hong Kong to attend a signing event. According to an entry at her blog, she said that this was her first overseas signing event.

In 2012, Fujiwara held a small charity auction featuring characters from her manga Kaichō wa Maid-sama!. She announced on her blog that the money would aid Tohoku's earthquake reconstruction from 2011. It was the first time she offered a signed and colored illustration.

Works

One-shots
Hanjuku Wolf
Kimi no Hidamari
Shōnen Scramble
Tōmei na Sekai
Kono Mama Ja Dame Mitai Desu  I Can't Stay Like This
Kaichō wa Maid-sama!

Sent-in works
Kaeri Michi, Yuki no Netsu
Akai Yume

Series

Awards
Best Rookie – 144th LaLa Manga Scout Course (LMS) for her work, Kaeri Michi, Yuki no Netsu
Fresh Debut – 36th LaLa Manga Grand Prix (LMG) for her work, Akai Yume
Outstanding Debut – 31st Hakusensha Athena Newcomers' Awards for her first series, Kaichō wa Maid-sama!

References

External links
Zero – Official website
Comic Holmes: Database of Hakusensha's Mangaka – Hiro Fujiwara 

Living people
Manga artists from Hyōgo Prefecture
Women manga artists
Japanese female comics artists
Female comics writers
1981 births
21st-century Japanese women writers